Caroline M. Miller (born ) is a United States Air Force lieutenant general who serves as the deputy chief of staff for manpower, personnel, and services of the United States Air Force since June 2022. She most recently served as the commander of the 502nd Air Base Wing and Joint Base San Antonio from November 22, 2020 to May 3, 2022, and previously served as director of manpower, organization, and resources of United States Air Force from June 2019 to June 2020.

She is the third active-duty woman in the Air Force to hold the rank of lieutenant general.

References

External links

1967 births
Living people
United States Air Force generals